Xinghua Prefecture was a Song dynasty military prefecture created in 979, under the administration of Fujian Circuit. It was abolished by the Mongol Yuan dynasty in 1277.

Its administrative area is roughly modern Putian and Xianyou County.

References

 

979 establishments
10th-century establishments in China
1277 disestablishments in Asia
13th-century disestablishments in China
Prefectures of the Song dynasty
Former prefectures in Fujian